Ben Feigin (September 11, 1975 – October 24, 2022) was an American television producer. Born in Silver Spring, Maryland, he was an executive producer of Schitt's Creek, for which he won a Primetime Emmy Award for Outstanding Comedy Series in 2020. He shared the award with other producers of the show, including Eugene Levy and Dan Levy. Feigin attended the University of California, Santa Barbara. He died from pancreatic cancer on October 24, 2022, at the age of 47.

References

External links

2022 deaths
Year of birth missing
American producers
Primetime Emmy Award winners
Deaths from cancer in California
Deaths from pancreatic cancer
People from Silver Spring, Maryland
Jewish American television producers
1975 births